Alvan-e Moslem (also Romanized as ʿAlvān-e Moslem) is a village in Azadeh Rural District, Moshrageh District, Ramshir County, Khuzestan Province, Iran. At the 2006 census, its population was 183, in 36 families.

References 

Populated places in Ramshir County